Ali Ben Mokrane Belkacem (15 April 1931 – 31 May 2006) was a French boxer. He competed in the men's welterweight event at the 1952 Summer Olympics.

References

1931 births
2006 deaths
French male boxers
Olympic boxers of France
Boxers at the 1952 Summer Olympics
Welterweight boxers